Law and economics, or economic analysis of law, is the application of microeconomic theory to the analysis of law, which emerged primarily from scholars of the Chicago school of economics. Economic concepts are used to explain the effects of laws, to assess which legal rules are economically efficient, and to predict which legal rules will be promulgated. There are two major branches of law and economics; one based on the application of the methods and theories of neoclassical economics to the positive and normative analysis of the law, and a second branch which focuses on an institutional analysis of law and legal institutions, with a broader focus on economic, political, and social outcomes, and overlapping with analyses of the institutions of politics and governance.

History

Origin 
The historical antecedents of law and economics can be traced back to the classical economists, who are credited with the foundations of modern economic thought. As early as the 18th century, Adam Smith discussed the economic effects of mercantilist legislation; later, David Ricardo opposed the British Corn Laws on the grounds that they hindered agricultural productivity; and Frédéric Bastiat, in his influential book The Law, examined the unintended consequences of legislation. However, to apply economics to analyze the law regulating nonmarket activities is relatively new. A European law & economics movement around 1900 did not have any lasting influence.

Harold Luhnow, the head of the Volker Fund, not only financed F. A. Hayek in the U.S. starting in 1946, but he shortly thereafter financed Aaron Director's coming to the University of Chicago in order to set up there a new center for scholars in law and economics. The University was headed by Robert Maynard Hutchins, a close collaborator of Luhnow's in setting up the Chicago School, as it became commonly known. The university faculty then included a strong base of libertarian scholars, including Frank Knight, George Stigler, Henry Simons, Ronald Coase and Jacob Viner. Soon, it would also have not just Hayek himself, but Director's brother-in-law and Stigler's friend Milton Friedman, and also Robert Fogel, Robert Lucas, Eugene Fama, Richard Posner, and Gary Becker.

Historians Robert van Horn and Philip Mirowski described the development of modern economic concepts in "The Rise of the Chicago School of Economics", a chapter of The Road from Mont Pelerin (2009); and historian Bruce Caldwell (a great admirer of von Hayek) filled in more details of the account in his chapter, "The Chicago School, Hayek, and Neoliberalism", in Building Chicago Economics (2011). The field began with Gary Becker’s 1968 paper on crime (Becker also received a Nobel Prize). In 1972, Richard Posner, a law and economics scholar and the major advocate of the positive theory of efficiency, published the first edition of Economic Analysis of Law and founded The Journal of Legal Studies, both are regarded as important events. Gordon Tullock and Friedrich Hayek also wrote intensively in the area and influenced to spread of law and economics.

Founding 
In 1958, Director founded The Journal of Law & Economics, which he co-edited with Nobel laureate Ronald Coase, and which helped to unite the fields of law and economics with far-reaching influence. In 1960 and 1961, Ronald Coase and Guido Calabresi independently published two groundbreaking articles, "The Problem of Social Cost" and "Some Thoughts on Risk Distribution and the Law of Torts". This can be seen as the starting point for the modern school of law and economics.

In 1962, Aaron Director helped to found the Committee on a Free Society. Director's appointment to the faculty of the University of Chicago Law School in 1946 began a half-century of intellectual productivity, although his reluctance about publishing left few writings behind. He taught antitrust courses at the law school with Edward Levi, who eventually would serve as Dean of Chicago's Law School, President of the University of Chicago, and as U.S. Attorney General in the Ford administration. After retiring from the University of Chicago Law School in 1965, Director relocated to California and took a position at Stanford University's Hoover Institution. He died September 11, 2004, at his home in Los Altos Hills, California, ten days before his 103rd birthday.

Later development 
In the early 1970s, Henry Manne (a former student of Coase) set out to build a center for law and economics at a major law school. He began at the University of Rochester, worked at the University of Miami, but was soon made unwelcome, moved to Emory University, and ended up at George Mason. The last soon became a center for the education of judges—many long out of law school and never exposed to numbers and economics. Manne also attracted the support of the John M. Olin Foundation, whose support accelerated the movement. Today, Olin centers (or programs) for Law and Economics exist at many universities.

Chicago School notable figures
Modern forerunners of economic thought developed at the Chicago School include Adam Smith, David Ricardo, and Frédéric Bastiat.

Founders include:
 Aaron Director, University of Chicago
 Ronald Coase, University of Chicago, 1991 Nobel Memorial Prize in Economic Sciences
 Richard Posner, University of Chicago
 Guido Calabresi, Yale University. Calabresi, judge for the U.S. Court of Appeals for the Second Circuit, wrote in depth on this subject; his book The Costs of Accidents: A Legal and Economic Analysis (1970) has been cited as influential in its extensive treatment of the proper incentives and compensation required in accident situations. Calabresi took a different approach in Ideals, Beliefs, Attitudes, and the Law (1985), where he argued, "who is the cheapest avoider of a cost, depends on the valuations put on acts, activities and beliefs by the whole of our law and not on some objective or scientific notion" (69).
 Henry Manne, George Mason University

Other notable individuals include:

 Gary Becker, Nobel Memorial Prize–winning economist and a leader of the Chicago School of Economics
 Frank Easterbrook, U.S. Court of Appeals for the Seventh Circuit judge
 Andrei Shleifer
 Robert Cooter
 Harold Demsetz
 Hans-Bernd Schäfer
 William Landes
 W. Kip Viscusi
 A. Mitchell Polinsky
 Michael Trebilcock

Positive and normative law and economics
Economic analysis of law is usually divided into two subfields: positive and normative.

Positive law and economics
'Positive law and economics' uses economic analysis to predict the effects of various legal rules.  So, for example, a positive economic analysis of tort law would predict the effects of a strict liability rule as opposed to the effects of a negligence rule.  Positive law and economics has also at times purported to explain the development of legal rules, for example the common law of torts, in terms of their economic efficiency.

Normative law and economics
Normative law and economics goes one step further and makes policy recommendations based on the economic consequences of various policies.  The key concept for normative economic analysis is efficiency, in particular, allocative efficiency.

A common concept of efficiency used by law and economics scholars is Pareto efficiency. A legal rule is Pareto efficient if it could not be changed so as to make one person better off without making another person worse off.  A weaker conception of efficiency is Kaldor–Hicks efficiency.  A legal rule is Kaldor–Hicks efficient if it could be made Pareto efficient by some parties compensating others as to offset their loss.

Nonetheless, the possibility of a clear distinction between positive and normative analysis has been questioned by Guido Calabresi who, in his book on "The future of Law and Economics" (2016: 21-22), believes that there is an "actual - and unavoidable - existence of value judgments underlying much economic analysis"

Uri Weiss proposed this alternative:  "It is common in law and economics to search for the law that will lead to the optimal outcome, providing the maximum size 'pie,' and to think about maximizing happiness instead of minimizing pain. We prefer another approach: We do not try to identify games that will lead to the optimal result but to prevent games in which it is in the best interests of the players to come to an unjust result".

Criminal law
In 1968, Gary Becker, who would later win the Nobel prize for economics, published Crime and Punishment: An Economic Approach. This work relied on the economic concept of utility as the basic unit of analysis. In 1985, in An Economic Theory of the Criminal Law, Posner set out an alternative approach that relied instead on wealth as the basic unit of analysis.

Relationship to other disciplines and approaches
As used by lawyers and legal scholars, the phrase "law and economics" refers to the application of microeconomic analysis to legal problems. Because of the overlap between legal systems and political systems, some of the issues in law and economics are also raised in political economy, constitutional economics and political science.

Approaches to the same issues from Marxist and critical theory/Frankfurt School perspectives usually do not identify themselves as "law and economics".  For example, research by members of the critical legal studies movement and the sociology of law considers many of the same fundamental issues as does work labeled "law and economics", though from a vastly different perspective. The law and political economy movement also analyzes similar concepts using an entirely different approach.

The one wing that represents a non-neoclassical approach to "law and economics" is the Continental (mainly German) tradition that sees the concept starting out of the governance and public policy (Staatswissenschaften) approach and the German Historical school of economics; this view is represented in the Elgar Companion to Law and Economics (2nd ed. 2005) and—though not exclusively—in the European Journal of Law and Economics. Here, consciously non-neoclassical approaches to economics are used for the analysis of legal (and administrative/governance) problems.

Law and economics is closely related to jurimetrics, the application of probability and statistics to legal questions.

Applications 

Affirmative action (Coate-Loury model)
Antitrust law (Herfindahl–Hirschman Index)
Calculus of negligence
Congestion pricing
Corporate governance
Cost-benefit analysis
Criminal law
Mass surveillance in the United States
Surveillance
Crime enforcement
Deregulation (Airlines, communications, energy, surface freight)
Design of contracts (Contract theory)
Efficient breach
Discrimination
Statistical discrimination (economics)
Drug policy (Iron law of prohibition)
Evidence
Evolution of the common law (Evolutionary game theory)
 Financial regulation (Efficient market hypothesis)
Fraud-on-the-market theory
Governance of the commons
Tragedy of the commons
Institutional origins
The Colonial Origins of Comparative Development: An Empirical Investigation
Constitutional economics
Legal origins theory
Property rights
Intellectual property (Economics and patents)
 Natural monopoly regulation (Averch–Johnson effect)
Peltzman effect
Principal–agent problem
Adverse selection
Moral hazard
Quarantine measures for public health
Prudent investor rule (Modern portfolio theory)
Rent control
Rent-seeking
Transaction costs (Coase theorem)
Value of a statistical life
Voting systems (Social choice theory)
Water law

Influence
The economic analysis of law has been influential in the United States as well as elsewhere.  Judicial opinions use economic analysis and the theories of law and economics with some regularity, in the US but also, increasingly, in Commonwealth countries and in Europe.  The influence of law and economics has also been felt in legal education, with graduate programs in the subject being offered in a number of countries. The influence of law and economics in civil law countries may be gauged from the availability of textbooks of law and economics, in English as well as in other European languages (Schäfer and Ott 2004; Mackaay 2013).

Many law schools in North America, Europe, and Asia have faculty members with a graduate degree in economics.  In addition, many professional economists now study and write on the relationship between economics and legal doctrines.  Anthony Kronman, former dean of Yale Law School, has written that "the intellectual movement that has had the greatest influence on American academic law in the past quarter-century [of the 20th Century]" is law and economics.

Criticisms

Despite its influence, the law and economics movement has been criticized from a number of directions.  This is especially true of normative law and economics.  Because most law and economics scholarship operates within a neoclassical framework, fundamental criticisms of neoclassical economics have been drawn from other, competing frameworks, though there are numerous internal critiques as well.  Yet other schools of economic thought have emerged and have been applied to the work of law and economics in, for example, the work of Edgardo Buscaglia and Robert Cooter in the book "Law and Economics of Development".

Rational choice theory 
Critics of the economic analysis of legal questions have argued that normative economic analysis does not capture the importance of human rights and concerns for distributive justice. Some of the heaviest criticisms of law and economics come from the critical legal studies movement, in particular Duncan Kennedy and Mark Kelman. Jon D. Hanson, of Harvard Law School, argues that our legal, economic, political, and social systems are unduly influenced by an individualistic model of behavior based on preferences, instead of a model that incorporates cognitive biases and social norms.

Pareto efficiency 

Additional criticism has been directed toward the assumed benefits of law and policy designed to increase allocative efficiency when such assumptions are modeled on "first-best" (Pareto optimal) general-equilibrium conditions. Under the theory of the second best, for example, if the fulfillment of a subset of optimal conditions cannot be met under any circumstances, it is incorrect to conclude that the fulfillment of any subset of optimal conditions will necessarily result in an increase in allocative efficiency.

Consequently, any expression of public policy whose purported purpose is an unambiguous increase in allocative efficiency (for example, consolidation of research and development costs through increased mergers and acquisitions resulting from a systematic relaxation of antitrust laws) is, according to critics, fundamentally incorrect, as there is no general reason to conclude that an increase in allocative efficiency is more likely than a decrease.

Essentially, the "first-best" neoclassical analysis fails to properly account for various kinds of general-equilibrium feedback relationships that result from intrinsic Pareto imperfections.

Another critique comes from the fact that there is no unique optimal result.  Warren Samuels in his 2007 book, The Legal-Economic Nexus, argues, "efficiency in the Pareto sense cannot dispositively be applied to the definition and assignment of rights themselves, because efficiency requires an antecedent determination of the rights (23–4)".

Criminal methodology 
Cullerne Bown has criticised Posner's approach on methodological grounds. He concludes that Posner’s approach to evaluating policies in the criminal process is methodologically invalid and that "these failings in turn make the entirety of his conclusions on the criminal process unreliable".

Responses to criticism 

Law and economics has adapted to some of these criticisms and been developed in a variety of directions. One important trend has been the application of game theory to legal problems. Other developments have been the incorporation of behavioral economics into economic analysis of law, and the increasing use of statistical and econometrics techniques. Within the legal academy, the term socio-economics has been applied to economic approaches that are self-consciously broader than the neoclassical tradition.

Property rights, which are analyzed using economic analysis, are seen as fundamental human rights by defenders of law and economics.

See also

Competition policy
Contract theory
Constitutionalism
Constitutional economics
Cost-benefit analysis
Economic imperialism (economics)
Economics
Iron law of prohibition
Islamic economical jurisprudence
Jurimetrics
Legal origins theory
Legal theory
Microeconomics
New institutional economics
Occupational licensing
Political economy
Property rights (economics)
Public choice theory

References

Further reading
Kai Purnhagen Never the Twain Shall Meet? – A Critical Perspective on Cultural Limits Between Internal Continental Dogmatism and Consequential US-Style Law and Economics Theory in Klaus Mathis Law and Economics in Europe (Springer Science), pp. 3–21, available at 
Bouckaert, Boudewijn, and Gerrit De Geest, eds. (2000). Encyclopedia of Law and Economics (Edward Elgar,  Online version.
Coase, Ronald (1990). The Firm, The Market, and the Law (Chicago: University of Chicago Press, reprint ed.) .
Cooter, Robert and Thomas Ulen (2012). Law and Economics (Addison Wesley Longman, 6th edition). 
 Friedman, David (1987). "law and economics," The New Palgrave: A Dictionary of Economics, v. 3, pp. 144–48.
 _ (2000). Law's Order. (Princeton University Press). Chapter links.  links.
 _ (2001). Law's Order: What Economics Has to Do with Law and Why It Matters.   .
 Martin Gelter & Kristoffel Grechenig, History of Law and Economics, forthcoming in Encyclopedia on Law & Economics.
Georgakopoulos, Nicholas L. (2005). Principles and Methods of Law and Economics: Basic Tools for Normative Reasoning (Cambridge University Press).
 Kristoffel Grechenig & Martin Gelter, The Transatlantic Divergence in Legal Thought: American Law and Economics vs. German Doctrinalism, Hastings International and Comparative Law Review 2008, vol. 31, pp. 295–360
 Kennedy, Duncan (1998). "Law-and-Economics from the Perspective of Critical Legal Studies" (from The New Palgrave Dictionary of Economics and the Law  PDF
 Kornhauser, Lewis (2006). "The Economic Analysis of Law," Stanford Encyclopedia of Philosophy.

 Mackaay, Ejan (2013), Law and Economics for Civil Law Systems, Cheltenham, Edward Elgar, ; softcover forthcoming 2014 

 Polinsky, A. Mitchell,  and Steven Shavell (2008). "law, economic analysis of," The New Palgrave Dictionary of Economics,  2nd Edition. Abstract and pre-publication copy.
Posner, Richard A. (2011). Economic Analysis of Law (New York, Wolters Kluwer Law & Business, 8th edition).   .
 _ (2006). "A Review of Steven Shavell's Foundations of Economic Analysis of Law,"  Journal of Economic Literature, 44(2),  pp. 405–14 (press +).
 Schäfer, Hans-Bernd and Claus Ott (2004), “Economic Analysis of Civil Law”, Cheltenham, Edward Elgar Publishing; 
 Shavell, Steven (2004).  Foundations of Economic Analysis of Law. Harvard University Press. Description and scroll to chapter-preview links.
 Robé, Jean-Philippe The Legal Structure of the Firm, Accounting, Economics, and Law: Vol. 1 : Iss. 1, Article 5, 2011. Jean-Philippe Robé

 Stojanovich A., Silvestri P. (Eds.), "Special Issue: On 'The Future of Law and Economics' by Guido Calabresi: An Interdisciplinary Dialogue", Global Jurist, 19(2019), 3.

External links
 "Law and Economics" article in the Internet Encyclopedia of Philosophy
 Law & Economics LAB
  Paper describing the effects of law and economics on inequality

 
Philosophy of law